Storchak is a gender-neutral Ukrainian surname. Notable people with the surname include:

Sergei Storchak (born 1954), Russian politician, current Deputy Finance Minister of Russia
Vasyl Storchak (born 1965), Ukrainian footballer and coach

See also
 

Ukrainian-language surnames